Narlai is a village in Desuri tehsil of Pali district in Rajasthan state in India. According to the 2001 Census of India, Narlai has a population of 6,190, where male are 2,968 and female are 3,222.

In old times, Narlai had over 100 temples. Currently, there are 22 beautifully carved temples which are open to visitors. Narlai has a granite monolith hill, known as Jaikal Hill, which offers good view of the Godwar area after climb of over 700 steps. There is a Shiva temple in cave in this hill, the cave is few hundred meter long.

Rawla Narlai, is a 17th century palace in Narlai, now converted to a heritage hotel.

On 15 June 1680, Tahawwur Khan, the general of Aurangzeb was defeated here by the combined force of Rathores and Sisodia Rajputs.

References

External links 

 Narlai

Villages in Pali district